"Bed of Nails" is a 1989 single by American singer Alice Cooper featuring singer/guitarist Kane Roberts, taken from the hit album Trash. It is the second highest-charting single from the album (the first being "Poison"), achieving No. 38 in the UK, although the single was not released in the US. The other three singles taken from Trash are "Poison", "House of Fire" and "Only My Heart Talkin'". "Bed of Nails" was written by Cooper, Desmond Child, Roberts and Diane Warren.

The song was covered by Children of Bodom on their EP Hellhounds on My Trail, and by Van Canto on their album Break the Silence.

Chart positions

References

Alice Cooper songs
1989 songs
1989 singles
Songs written by Diane Warren
Songs written by Desmond Child
Songs written by Alice Cooper
Song recordings produced by Desmond Child
Epic Records singles
Glam metal songs